was a fighter aircraft and airbase garrison unit of the Imperial Japanese Navy (IJN) during the Pacific campaign of World War II. The flying portion of the unit was heavily involved in many of the major campaigns and battles of the first year of the war. The exploits of the unit were widely publicized in the Japanese media at the time, at least in part because the unit spawned more aces than any other fighter unit in the IJN. Several of the unit's aces were among the IJN's top scorers, and included Hiroyoshi Nishizawa, Saburō Sakai, Junichi Sasai, Watari Handa, Masaaki Shimakawa, and Toshio Ōta.

History

Philippines and Dutch East Indies
The unit was formed at Tainan, Taiwan (then part of the Empire of Japan) on October 1, 1941 as part of the 23rd Air Flotilla. The unit's first commander was Captain Hiroshi Higuchi, who was relieved by Commander Masahisa Saito on 4 October 1941. Most of the unit's original pilots were veterans of aerial combat in the Second Sino-Japanese War. Just before the outbreak of war with the Allied powers, the unit consisted of 45 A6M Zero and 12 Type 96 fighter aircraft.

On 8 December 1941 forty-four Tainan aircraft escorted IJN bombers in attacks on US aircraft at Iba and Clark airfields on Luzon in the Philippines, a distance of 500 miles each way. The attacks almost completely destroyed General Douglas MacArthur's air forces. On 10 December Tainan Zeros shot down the B-17 bomber piloted by Colin Kelly. Later that month, the unit redeployed to the Philippines and continued to support Japanese forces as they overran and destroyed the territory's American and Filipino defenses.

The Tainan Naval Air Group then moved to Tarakan Island, followed by moves to Balikpapan and Denpasar, Bali to support the successful Japanese offensive into the Dutch East Indies beginning in January 1942. The unit's fighters helped inflict heavy losses on defending Allied aircraft in January and February 1942.

New Guinea
With the end of the campaign in March, the unit was integrated into the 25th Air Flotilla and redeployed to recently captured Rabaul, New Britain and Lae, Papua New Guinea in April. As of 25 April 1942, due to operational and combat losses, the Tainan Air Group, now under the command of Captain Masahisa Saitō, counted 26 Zero and six Type 96 "Claude" fighters.

The unit initially concentrated its aircraft at Lae to support an air campaign against the Australian and American forces stationed at Port Moresby. Between April and July, the Tainan Air Group flew 51 missions, totalling 602 sorties. During this time, the unit claimed to have destroyed 300 enemy aircraft. The Tainan's losses were 20 aircraft. Replacement aircraft gave the unit a total of 24 Zeros by August 1942, flown by 55 pilots. Because of the surplus in aircrew, only the most experienced pilots were allowed to fly combat missions.

Guadalcanal

On August 7, United States Marines landed on Japanese-occupied Guadalcanal, initiating the Guadalcanal Campaign. In response that same day, 18 Tainan fighters escorted bombers from Rabaul for an attack on the Allied invasion fleet, the longest fighter mission of the war (556 miles each way) to that date. The Tainan claimed to have destroyed 43 enemy aircraft over Guadalcanal on that mission while losing two fighters with their pilots themselves.  The Americans actually lost 10 aircraft, including nine of 18 fighters present, plus one dive bomber. The two Tainan pilots killed on this mission were Petty Officer First Class Yoshida and Petty Officer Second Class Nishiura

One significant Tainan casualty over Guadalcanal that day was Saburō Sakai, who was seriously injured and forced into a two-year recuperation. The US Marines on August 8 captured an airfield (later called Henderson Field) under construction by the Japanese on Guadalcanal which was soon operational with Allied aircraft.

Over the next several months, Tainan aircraft based at Rabaul engaged in repeated dogfights with Allied aircraft, called the Cactus Air Force, based on Guadalcanal.  The extreme distances required for the Tainan pilots to fly from Rabaul to Guadalcanal severely hampered the unit's attempts to establish air superiority over the island. The unit also continued to support bombing missions against Port Moresby. Between August and November 1942, the Tainan lost 32 pilots killed in action. Junichi Sasai was killed on August 26 and Toshio Ōta on October 21.

On November 1, 1942 the Japanese naval units in the Southeast Pacific were reorganized. The Tainan was redesignated as the 251 Air Group and reconstituted with replacement aircrews. The 20 surviving pilots of the Tainan were transferred to Japan to help form new fighter units. Bergerud says only 10 pilots were left and that the new unit was not called the "251st Air Group". Each digit in "251" refers to a discrete attribute of the new organization.

Personnel Assigned

Commanding Officers
Capt. Higuchi Hiroshi (40) - 1 October 1941 - 4 October 1941
Cdr. / Capt. Saito Masahisa (47) - 4 October 1941 - 1 November 1942 (Promoted Captain on 1 May 1942.)

Executive Officers
VACANT - 1 October 1941 - 1 November 1942

Maintenance Officers
VACANT - 1 October 1941 - 15 October 1942
Lt. (Eng.) Nishimoto Hisashi (Eng. 41) - 15 October 1942 - 1 November 1942

Surgeons
LtCdr. (Med.) Fujimura Nobuyoshi (1929) - 1 October 1941 - 1 August 1942
LtCdr. (Med.) Nishino Denkichi (1929) - 1 August 1942 - 1 November 1942

Paymasters
Lt. (Pay.) Kaneko Seizaburo (Pay. Aux. 2) - 1 October 1941 - 1 November 1942

Communications Officers
LtCdr. Sonoda Yoshiteru (56) - 1 October 1941 - 1 November 1942

Air Officers
LtCdr. / Cdr. Kozono Yasuna (51) - 1 October 1941 - 1 November 1942 (Promoted Commander on 15 October 1941.)

References
Notes

Bibliography

External links

Groups of the Imperial Japanese Navy Air Service
Military units and formations established in 1941
Military units and formations disestablished in 1942